Lecavalier is a surname that may refer to:

 Laurine Lecavelier French figure skater 
 Louise Lecavalier, Canadian dancer
 Narcisse Lecavalier (1827–1892), notary and political figure in Quebec
 René Lecavalier (1918–1999), Canadian French-language radio show host and sportscaster on SRC in Quebec
 Vincent Lecavalier, Canadian ice hockey player